Psychology & Marketing is a monthly peer-reviewed scientific journal covering the psychological study of marketing and consumer behavior. It was established in 1984 and is published by John Wiley & Sons. The editor-in-chief is Giampaolo Viglia.

Impact factor
According to the Journal Citation Reports, the journal has a 2021 impact factor of 5.507, ranking it 68th out of 155 journals in the category "Business" and 18rd out of 83 in the category "Psychology, Applied".

References

External links

Digital Marketing

Monthly journals
Marketing journals
Applied psychology journals
Wiley (publisher) academic journals
Publications established in 1984
English-language journals